Project Blinkenlights was a light installation in the Haus des Lehrers building at the Alexanderplatz in Berlin that transformed the building front into a giant low-resolution monochrome computer screen. The installation was created by the German Chaos Computer Club (CCC) and went online on 11 September 2001 as a celebration of the club's 20th birthday. Some novel uses of the screen are for people to call a number and play Pong via mobile phone or display animations sent in by the public.

Similar installations were created by the CCC for the Bibliothèque nationale de France in Paris in 2002 (called Arcade) and for two towers of the City Hall in Toronto (called Stereoscope). Both installations feature higher resolutions and eight shades of grey.

The electrical engineering and computer science students of the Budapest University of Technology and Economics turn their Schönherz Dormitory into a giant display ("the Matrix") at their annual Schönherz Cup competition, where amongst others, teams compete to create the most interesting and funny animations.

A similar display, featuring three colours, is annually created by students of Wrocław University of Technology and the University of Bordeaux,who have released open-source software to create interactive architectural displays.

Independently, an installation displaying the message "" (German for "FINISHED") was shown at the completion of the Elbphilharmonie in Hamburg in 2016.

The term "blinkenlights" originates in hacker humor. One of the CCC installations is depicted in the Golden Boy and Miss Kittin video for their song "Rippin Kittin".

See also
 Voices For The Future (a similar installation by Project Pressure)

References

External links

 
 Video of a winning Schönherz animation and homepage of the Schönherz Blinkenlights

Installation art works